Keyhole sand dollar refers to three species of sand dollars in the genus Mellita. They are found on the Atlantic coasts of the Americas, ranging from Caribbean Islands, such as Jamaica and Puerto Rico, to the southern areas of the United States at the north to the southern coasts of Brazil at the south. Their range includes Bermuda and the Pacific coasts of equatorial countries, such as Mexico and Costa Rica also found in Honduras.

The velvet-like skin of live keyhole sand dollars is usually tan, brown, grey or dark green in colour. Like all sand dollars, they are found in shallow seawater below tide lines, where they burrow into the seabed to obtain food. The creatures feed on fine particles of plankton and other organic matter they filter from the water.

Keyhole sand dollars are so named because of the distinctive keyhole-shaped perforation toward the rear of the endoskeleton. This body shape offers an example of secondary front-to-back bilateral symmetry in an organism whose adult anatomy is primarily based on fivefold radial symmetry. The radial symmetry is characteristic of echinoids generally, including the ancestors of sand dollars. The bilateral features evolved as adaptations to a burrowing lifestyle.

Mellita isometra ranges across the east coast of the United States. Mellita tenuis appears across the Caribbean and Gulf Coasts of Florida and nearby states. Mellita quinquiesperforata inhabits a wide range, from near the Mississippi Delta to Mexico and the Caribbean region and the coasts of South America.

References
Mellita quinquiesperforata
Invertebrates
Keyhole Sand Dollar and NC Sea Grant
Aristotle's Lantern

See also
Sand dollar
Echinoderms

Mellitidae